(born 23 April 1997) is a Hong Kong footballer of Japanese heritage who plays for Hong Kong Premier League club Biu Chun Rangers as a right midfielder. He is studying in a Hong Kong Japanese International School.

Club career

South China

Youth team
In 2011, Jige joined South China youth academy, also known as Wanchai South China.

2012–13 season
On 8 December 2012, Jige was selected to the first team squad for friendly match against S.L. Benfica de Macau. Jige was substituted in the second half of the friendly match. On 17 December 2012, about a week after he played his first match for the first team, he, signed a professional contract with South China. He soon made his debut for South China first team on 26 December 2012, in the FA Cup first round first leg away match against Citizen at Mong Kok Stadium, as an 86th-minute substitute, which he helped the team secure the 2–0 victory.

Career statistics
 As of 26 December 2012

References

1997 births
Living people
Association football midfielders
South China AA players
Hong Kong First Division League players
Hong Kong footballers
Hong Kong people of Japanese descent